Heteracantha depressa is a species of beetle in the family Carabidae, the only species in the genus Heteracantha.

References

Harpalinae
Beetles described in 1834